Enesco (Enesco, LLC) is an American company specializing in the sales and distribution of giftware. The company was known as an industry leader as it carried the Precious Moments porcelain figurine line of products during the 1970s, 1980s, and 1990s.

History

In 1958, Enesco was the import division for the N. Shure Company. Enesco was founded by its first President, Louis R. "Bob" Miller, Jr. When N. Shure was sold to Butler Brothers, the import division was spun off. The name "Enesco"  was an  acronym from the N. Shure company, "N S Co", and phonetically named his company "EnEsCo". 

Thereafter, the company was sold three times, and in 1983 became a part of Stanhome, Inc. After separating from Stanhome in 1998, Stanhome immediately collapsed—leaving Enesco with all of Stanhome's assets.

Enesco is known in its industry for its 25 years of success with the Precious Moments porcelain figurine line of products. Freedman worked with original artist, Sam Butcher, to bring his designs to market. The company sales soared throughout the '70s, '80s, and '90s until its peak in 1997. 

By 2004, Enesco, Corp. posted an operating loss of $15.7 million US dollars. The sales of Precious Moments items plunged from a high of $206 million in 1996 to $55.7 million in 2004, a drop of $27.5 million from 2003. 

According to Enesco's 2004–2005 annual report, "Precious Moments revenues represented 22% of consolidated net revenues in 2004 compared to 33% in 2003." In 2005 Enesco ended its business partnership and license arrangement with Precious Moments, Inc.

In 2006, a year after the departure of Precious Moments, Enesco's fourth president, Cynthia Passmore-McLaughlin (formerly of Revlon) resigned. Enesco's stock price fell below  and was delisted from the New York Stock Exchange. After a few months of over-the-counter trading, Enesco withdrew its public offering altogether. On January 12, 2007, Enesco filed for Chapter 11 bankruptcy protection.

In February 2007, Enesco Group, Inc. was purchased by Tinicum Capital Partners and became Enesco, LLC.

Balmoral Funds, a Los Angeles-based private equity fund acquired Enesco, LLC in 2015.

Spin Master acquired the Gund business from Enesco in 2018

References

External links
 Enesco Corporation official site

Companies based in DuPage County, Illinois
Itasca, Illinois
Distribution companies of the United States
Business services companies established in 1958
1958 establishments in Illinois
Companies that filed for Chapter 11 bankruptcy in 2007
2015 mergers and acquisitions